"You Make It Easy" is a song written by Florida Georgia Line members Tyler Hubbard and Brian Kelley with Morgan Wallen and Jordan Schmidt and recorded by American country music singer Jason Aldean. It was released in February 2018 as the first single from Aldean's 2018 album Rearview Town.

Content
Brian Kelley and Tyler Hubbard, who comprise the duo Florida Georgia Line, wrote the song with Morgan Wallen and Jordan Schmidt. It is the fourth song co-written by the duo that Aldean has recorded, after the singles "Burnin' It Down" and "Lights Come On", and the album cut "Black Tears".

According to Wallen, Hubbard was inspired by his wife, Hayley, and the relationship that the two have despite Hubbard being constantly on the road as a musician. Wallen also stated that he had most of the song written starting with the hook, when Schmidt added the "groove". The song features a 6/8 time signature which Cillea Houghton of Taste of Country compared to Keith Urban's 2017 hit "Blue Ain't Your Color". In it, Aldean sings of loving his wife, and how she "make[s] it easy" to love her in return.

Commercial performance
On the chart dated February 3, 2018, "You Make It Easy" debuted at number 26 on the US Billboard Country Airplay chart. It has since reached number 14. The next week, it debuted at number 28 on the Billboard Hot 100 due to strength of digital sales. The song reached number one on the Country Airplay for chart dated May 5, 2018, thus becoming Aldean's 18th number one hit.

"You Make It Easy" sold 77,000 copies in its first week of sales. It was the top-selling country song of the week. It has sold 601,000 copies in the United States as of January 2019.

Music video
The song features a three-part music video spanning 15 minutes, directed by Shaun Silva. In it, actor Luke Benward plays a man who is injured in a car accident. Silva said that he was inspired by the video for "What Hurts the Most" by Rascal Flatts, which he also directed.

Charts

Weekly charts

Year-end charts

Certifications

References 

2018 singles
Jason Aldean songs
BBR Music Group singles
Songs written by Brian Kelley (musician)
Songs written by Tyler Hubbard
Songs written by Jordan Schmidt
Songs written by Morgan Wallen
Song recordings produced by Michael Knox (record producer)
Music videos directed by Shaun Silva
2018 songs
Country ballads